Omar Federico Alderete Fernández (born 26 December 1996) is a Paraguayan professional footballer who plays as a centre-back for La Liga club Getafe, on loan from  club Hertha BSC. He also represents the Paraguay national team.

Club career

Early career
Alderete began his career with Cerro Porteño, he played for their U20s at the 2016 U-20 Copa Libertadores between January and February 2016 where he scored one goal (vs. Bolívar) in three games. Months later, in May 2016, Alderete made his professional debut for the club in a Paraguayan Primera División loss to Rubio Ñu. In his third league appearance, he scored his first senior goal in an away win versus Guaraní on 31 July. In August 2017, Alderete joined Argentine Primera División side Gimnasia y Esgrima on loan. His first appearance came in a 4–4 draw with Defensa y Justicia on 26 August.

Huracán and Basel
After one goal in twenty-two matches for Gimnasia y Esgrima, Alderete completed a transfer to Huracán at the conclusion of his loan spell. 

On 4 June 2019, Alderete agreed a move to Swiss Super League outfit Basel; with the deal officially going through on 11 June. Alderete joined Basel's first team for their 2019–20 FC Basel season under head coach Marcel Koller. After playing in five test games, Alderete played his domestic league debut for the club in the away game in the Stade Tourbillon on 19 July 2019 as Basel won 4–1 against Stade Tourbillon.He scored his first goal for his team four days later, on 23 July 2019, in the away game in the Philips Stadion in the second qualifying round of the 2019–20 UEFA Champions League. But this could not help the team, as Basel were defeated 2–3 by PSV Eindhoven, who scored two goals in the last minutes of the game.

Alderete left the club during the transfer window of the next season. During his short period with the club Alderete played a total of 64 games for Basel scoring a total of four goals. 31 of these games were in the Swiss Super League, six in the Swiss Cup, four in the Champions League, 13 in the Europa League and 10 were friendly games. He scored two goals in the domestic league, one in the Swiss Cup and one in the Champions League.

Hertha BSC
On 5 October 2020, Alderete signed a long-term deal with Hertha BSC. He made his debut in a 2–1 debut at the Red Bull Arena against RB Leipzig on 24 October. On 12 July 2021, Alderete signed with Valencia CF on a season-long loan with the option to buy. On 19 August 2022, he joined Getafe on loan with option to buy.

International career
Alderete has represented Paraguay at U17, U20 and U23 level. He won eight caps for the U17 team at the 2013 South American Under-17 Football Championship in Argentina, prior to winning seven caps for the U20s at the 2015 South American Youth Football Championship in Uruguay. In May 2016, Alderete played four times for the U23s at the 2016 Toulon Tournament in France, scoring one goal in a win over Guinea on 19 May. He was called up to train with Juan Carlos Osorio's senior squad in 2018. He made his debut for them on 20 November 2018 in a friendly against South Africa; as a starter.

Career statistics

Club

International

References

External links

1996 births
Living people
Sportspeople from Asunción
Paraguayan footballers
Paraguay under-20 international footballers
Paraguay international footballers
Association football defenders
Paraguayan Primera División players
Argentine Primera División players
Swiss Super League players
Bundesliga players
La Liga players
Cerro Porteño players
Club de Gimnasia y Esgrima La Plata footballers
Club Atlético Huracán footballers
FC Basel players
Hertha BSC players
Valencia CF players
Getafe CF footballers
Paraguayan expatriate footballers
Expatriate footballers in Argentina
Expatriate footballers in Switzerland
Expatriate footballers in Germany
Expatriate footballers in Spain
Paraguayan expatriate sportspeople in Argentina
Paraguayan expatriate sportspeople in Switzerland
Paraguayan expatriate sportspeople in Germany
Paraguayan expatriate sportspeople in Spain